Frank Arens (born 16 August 1959) is a Belgian sports shooter. He competed at the 1984 Summer Olympics and the 1988 Summer Olympics.

References

1959 births
Living people
Belgian male sport shooters
Olympic shooters of Belgium
Shooters at the 1984 Summer Olympics
Shooters at the 1988 Summer Olympics
Sportspeople from Ghent